John Hung Shan-chuan  (born November 20, 1943) was the archbishop of the Roman Catholic Archdiocese of Taipei. He was first appointed to the post in November 2007, having previously served as the bishop of the Diocese of Kiayi. His episcopal resignation was accepted by Pope Francis on May 23, 2020, and his care of diocese was immediately succeeded by Archbishop Thomas Chung An-Zu.

References

External links

1943 births
Living people
People from Penghu County
Divine Word Missionaries Order
21st-century Roman Catholic archbishops in Taiwan
Taiwanese Roman Catholic archbishops